Diplopterys is a genus of plants in the Malpighiaceae family.

There are approximately 45 species within the genus:
Diplopterys amplectens (B.Gates) W.R.Anderson & C.Davis
Diplopterys araujei (Schwacke ex Nied.) Nied.
Diplopterys bahiana
Diplopterys bracteosa
Diplopterys cabrerana (Cuatrec.) B.Gates
Diplopterys cachimbensis
Diplopterys caduciflora
Diplopterys carvalhoi
Diplopterys cristata
Diplopterys cururensis
Diplopterys cururuensis
Diplopterys erianthera
Diplopterys heterostyla
Diplopterys hypericifolia
Diplopterys includens
Diplopterys involuta
Diplopterys involuta var. ovata
Diplopterys krukoffii
Diplopterys leiocarpa
Diplopterys longialata (Nied.) W. R. Anderson & C. Davis 
Diplopterys lucida
Diplopterys lutea
Diplopterys marsballiana
Diplopterys marshalliana
Diplopterys mexicana
Diplopterys microcarpa
Diplopterys nigrescens
Diplopterys nutans
Diplopterys paralias
Diplopterys paralias var. latifolia
Diplopterys patula
Diplopterys pauciflora
Diplopterys pauciflora var. latifolia
Diplopterys peruviana
Diplopterys platyptera
Diplopterys populifolia
Diplopterys pubipetala
Diplopterys riparia
Diplopterys rondoniensis
Diplopterys rosea
Diplopterys schunkei
Diplopterys sepium
Diplopterys spruceana
Diplopterys uleana
Diplopterys valvata
Diplopterys virgultosa
Diplopterys woytkowskii

References

External links
Diplopterys Herbarium Specimens (fm1.fieldmuseum.org)

Malpighiaceae
Malpighiaceae genera